Mount Marlow is a rural locality in the Whitsunday Region, Queensland, Australia. In the  Mount Marlow had a population of 132 people.

Geography 
It is in the eastern part of the locality.

The Proserpine–Shute Harbour Road (State Route 59) passes through the locality from south to north and then runs along the northern boundary.

History 
Mount Marlow Provisional School opened on 1900. On 1 January 1909 it became Mount Marlow State School. It closed in 1954.

In the  Mount Marlow had a population of 132 people.

Education 
There are no schools in Mount Marlow. The nearest primary schools are Proserpine State School in Proserpine to the south-west and Cannonvale State School in Cannonvale to the north-east. The nearest secondary school is Prosperine State High School in Proserpine.

References 

Whitsunday Region
Localities in Queensland